Beaudesert could refer to:

Australia
Beaudesert, Queensland, a town in Queensland, Australia
Electoral district of Beaudesert, an Australian electoral district, which includes the town of Beaudesert, Queensland
Shire of Beaudesert, a former local government area of Queensland, Australia

United Kingdom 
Beaudesert, Warwickshire, a village and civil parish in Warwickshire, England
Beaudesert Castle, an archaeological site in the village of Beaudesert in Warwickshire, England
Beaudesert (House), the Staffordshire country seat of the Paget family - the Marquess of Anglesey
Beaudesert Park School, a prep school in Gloucestershire, England